Eva, The Sin (German: Eva, die Sünde) is a 1920 Austrian silent drama film directed by Jacob Fleck and Luise Fleck and starring Liane Haid, Max Neufeld and Karl Ehmann.

Cast
 Liane Haid as Eva 
 Max Neufeld as Baltramus 
 Karl Ehmann as Abt von St. Bernhard 
 Mario Bergugliano as Marquis d'Etoile 
 Josef Recht as Bruder Hilarius

References

Bibliography
 Robert Von Dassanowsky. Austrian Cinema: A History. McFarland, 2005.

External links

1920 films
Austrian silent feature films
Films directed by Jacob Fleck
Films directed by Luise Fleck
1920 drama films
Austrian drama films
Austrian black-and-white films
Silent drama films